Viktor Sergeyevich Vasilyev (born 23 July 1959) is a former Russian professional footballer.

Club career
He made his professional debut in the Soviet Second League in 1977 for FC Torpedo Volzhsky.

Honours
 Soviet Top League runner-up: 1986.

European club competitions
With FC Dynamo Moscow.

 European Cup Winners' Cup 1984–85: 4 games.
 UEFA Cup 1987–88: 4 games, 1 goal.

References

1959 births
People from Salavat
Living people
Soviet footballers
Russian footballers
Association football midfielders
FC Energiya Volzhsky players
FC Rotor Volgograd players
PFC CSKA Moscow players
FC Dynamo Moscow players
FC Dynamo Stavropol players
FC Spartak Vladikavkaz players
Soviet Top League players
Russian expatriate footballers
Expatriate footballers in Finland
Sportspeople from Bashkortostan